Club de Fútbol Loros de la Universidad de Colima was Mexican football club that lastly played in the Ascenso MX, the second tier division of Mexican football. The club was based in Colima, Mexico.

The team was participating in the Ascenso MX during the 2016–17 season after earning promotion by winning the Torneo Clausura 2015 Championship over Cruz Azul Hidalgo and the Final de Ascenso against U.A. Estado de Mexico (winners of Apertura 2014). They were initially going to get promoted during the 2015–2016 season, but they did not meet the stadium requirements.

In 2019, they returned to Ascenso MX after two years playing at Liga Premier – Serie A, the third tier division of Mexican football. However, on December 27, 2019, the team was dissolved after the Jimmy Goldsmith's death, the businessman was the owner since 2008, and his family had no interest in keeping the club, which meant its dissolution.

History
The team was born in the Third Division of Mexico, debuting on September 10, 1981, playing their matches in Manzanillo until that year when the University of Colima acquired at a price of 400 million pesos in San Jorge Stadium, which would become the team headquarters. It would be in the same tournament that would be positioned between the first places from his first foray.

In the 1981-1982 league championship from August to May, he finished first in its group, which won the right to play the playoffs for promotion to the Second Division of Mexico and was runner-up in their group; therefore, this team was invited to join the category of the Second Division of Mexico in Group B, but declined the invitation for economic reasons.

This team participated in a quadrangular made in Cihuatlán, Jalisco, in the league championship of 1982–1983, one of their players was called to participate as a starter in the forward position of the Mexican college football who represented Mexico in University World Championship.
In the campaign of 1985, Héctor Hernández took an undefeated campaign that ended when missing three games. The Chale died on June 18, 1984, when as coach of Loros de Colima, suffered a car accident traveling to the city of Colima, Colima, Hernández would be the only one who died in the accident.

In professional sports, the University of Colima participated in the championship of the Mexican Football Federation, 1986–1987, remaining in second place in their group, which won the right to go to the tournament "Liguilla de Ascenso".

In 1991 the University of Colima for two years gave the franchise its Loros team Club Deportivo Colimense by a sum of 150 million pesos. The club was nicknamed Colimense Palmeros, winning the tournament from 1992 to 1993, and the contract was extended for several years, changing its name to simply Palmeros de Colima in the nineties.

After a cooperation agreement with the State Government, that the University of Colima and the state administration shared the franchise Palmeros de Colima with fifty percent for each of the instances, it was announced that the Palmeros would be called Palmeros- Loros, militating in Second Division of Mexico and being his coach, François Omam-Biyik.

The team was called Palmeros-Loros, until the governor Silverio Cavazos, gave fifty percent of its stake in the franchise team, renamed only Loros de la Universidad de Colima. In this change, which is designated to Ernesto Santana as coach, who was one of the pillars of that team Third Division of Mexico in the eighties lead the front of the Chivas of Guadalajara and the Mexican, Hector Hernandez.

In 2008, with support from entrepreneur Jimmy Goldsmith, Atlético Cihuatlan, who had been champion of Torneo Clausura 2007 of the Third Division of Mexico and thus had risen, he merged with Loros de Colima, joining several players and Octavio Mora as coach. Loros happened to be formed by a team led by owner Octavio Mora, and one reservation, directed by Jose Ernesto Santana Diaz, composed colimenses and nurture young players into the first team. The official club team called "The Kotorra" which is located in the north.

They played their first Final in Second Division of Mexico in the Apertura 2008 before the Venados de Mérida FC. After being tied 2–2 on aggregate, Mérida FC won 3–2 at varsity. Loros had taken a 1–0 lead in the first leg held in Yucatán, but in return, Loros surprised at the Olympic Stadium and leveled the aggregate score of 2–1.

During the same Apertura 2008 Liga Premier de Ascdnso of the Second Division of Mexico, Loros scored 41 points and finished as General League Leader. That was also the best offense in the tournament with 47 Goals and the best defense in the Northern Zone.

Upon completion of the Clausura 2012, despite having qualified for the playoffs, team president decided not to play that stage, claiming that the team did not see any from the date 10 victory, garnering only 4 points in 15 disputed points, so it was settled to all players and the rumor of the sale of the franchise, which did not happen came. On 15 May 2012 the University of Colima and the Club presented a project for the Apertura 2012 Ascent Premier League, where the team would be made up entirely of players born in the state of Colima.

A year after he launched the new project, the Loros team from the University of Colima played its second final in Second Mexican division, this time to Linces of Tlaxcala in the Apertura 2013 Liga Premier de Ascenso. After being tied 3–3 on aggregate, Linces won 8–7 on sudden death. Loros had taken a 3–1 lead in the first leg held in Colima, but on lap Linces tied the overall score of 2–0.

During the Apertura 2013 Premier Ascent League Loros was the team with the most points scored during the tournament and was leader of Group 2, but due to the percentage, ended up as deputy leader in the General Table of League. Also, its strikers Jorge "El Perico" Amador and Juan Carlos Martinez respectively won the titles of Champion and runner-up in the Premier League.

On May 9, 2015, Loros settled for the third time in the final of the Second Division of Mexico, but this time was the charm for Loros, as last Champions Clausura 2015 of the Liga Premier was proclaimed, the defeat on aggregate 3-2 Cruz Azul Hidalgo. In the first leg, Cruz Azul Hidalgo took a 2–1 lead in Ciudad Cooperativa Cruz Azul; but in return, the whole of the University of Colima won 1–0 in regular time, forcing the match into extra time where Loros had the opportunity to make the final 2-0 that gave the championship of the Second division and the opportunity to play the final for promotion to Potros of Autonomous University of the State of Mexico, 2014 Apertura champion team.

During the 2015 Clausura tournament Liga Premier de Ascenso of the Second Division of Mexico, Loros was deputy leader General League with 26 points. Besides his striker Juan Carlos "The Cream" Martinez finished as runner-up scorer by scoring 13 touchdowns during the tournament in the Premier Liga de Ascenso.
A week later, on May 16, 2015, Loros was crowned champion after winning 2014–2015 season with a total of 3-1 Potros Autonomous University of the State of Mexico and thus obtained their pass to Ascenso MX, a prelude to the pinnacle of Mexican Professional Soccer.

In the first leg in State of Mexico, Potros and Loros did not damage each other, so all emotions were reserved for the return at the Estadio Olimpico Universitario in Colima, where finally Loros defeated Potros UAEM 3-1 and they were crowned as champions of Segunda Division of Mexico.

The square in the Ascenso MX was reserved for Loros, who begin their adventure in the anteroom of the Mexican First Division until July 2016 in the Apertura 2016 tournament, but while contest the Apertura 2015 and Clausura 2016 in the Second Division Mexico while the Estadio Olimpico Universitario was adapted with the conditions required by the Mexican Football Federation to host games for Ascenso MX and Copa MX.

After a year of a wait, Loros finally play in Ascenso MX in Colima after a 6-year absence. However, Loros had a bad start in the first half of season finishing 17th. But on April 9, 2017, Loros Colima was relegated back to Segunda Division after Tampico Madero won over UDG, the day after Loros loss to Zacatepec Siglo XXI (one week before the season finale). Least a week later, Loros Colima won in front of their home crowd for the final time in Ascenso MX play against Atlante of a score of 3–1.

In May 2018, Loros won the Torneo Clausura 2018 in Serie A, but, they were defeated by Tepatitlán on promotion final. On May, 2019, the team won their third second division title and was promoted to Ascenso MX after two years in the third tier division of Mexican football. However, on December 27, 2019, the team was dissolved after the Jimmy Goldsmith's death, the businessman was the owner since 2008, and his family had no interest in keeping the club, which meant its dissolution.

Stadium

U. de C. play their home matches at the Estadio Olímpico Universitario de Colima in Colima City, Colima. The stadium capacity is 11,812 people. Its owned by U. de C., and its surface is covered by natural grass. The stadium was opened in 1994.

Players

Current squad

Honours
Segunda División de México Serie A: 3
Clausura 2015, Clausura 2018, 2018-2019

Segunda División de México Serie A (Final de Ascenso): 1
2014-2015

See also
Football in Mexico

References

External links
Official Site  (in Spanish)

Football clubs in Colima
Association football clubs established in 1981
1981 establishments in Mexico
Liga Premier de México
2019 disestablishments in Mexico
Association football clubs disestablished in 2019